The videography and filmography of British singer, composer and pianist Elton John consists of 175 music videos and 17 video albums.

Since 1970, John has continually released promotional music videos, beginning with "Your Song" and only sporadically releasing videos thereafter. It was not until Visions, a release that included music videos of every song from his 1981 album The Fox, as well as the rise of MTV, that he began to release videos more frequently.

John had usually appeared in his music videos, but after 2001, John began appearing less and less in his own videos, sometimes opting to have other actors, such famous names as Justin Timberlake ("This Train Don't Stop There Anymore") and Robert Downey, Jr. ("I Want Love"), lip-synch the lyrics.

Music videos

1970-1980

1981-1982 - Visions: The Fox Videos

Notes
 The album The Fox was released on May 20, 1981. However, Visions became available only in 1982.

1982-1989

1990-1999

2000-2009

2010-2019

2020-2022

David LaChapelle's the Red Piano Music Videos
Videos directed by photographer David LaChapelle for Elton John's the Red Piano stage at the Colosseum Caesar's Palace in Las Vegas.

Video albums

Filmography 

 Born to Boogie, US (1972) as himself with Marc Bolan and Ringo Starr
 Tommy, UK (1975) as Pinball Wizard
 The Muppet Show (1978) (season 2) guest appearance as himself
 Totally Minnie (1988) as himself
 Spice World, UK (1997) as himself
 The Nanny (1997) as himself
 Elton John: Tantrums & Tiaras (1997) autobiography as himself
 South Park (1998) (season 2) guest appearance as himself
 The Simpsons (1998) (season 10) guest appearance as himself
 The Road to El Dorado (2000) as the Narrator
 Bob the Builder, UK (2001) episode "A Christmas to Remember" as himself
 The Country Bears, US (2002) as himself
 Elton John: Me, Myself & I (2007) autobiography as himself
 Nashville (2016) (season 4) guest appearance as himself
 The American Epic Sessions (2017) as himself
 Kingsman: The Golden Circle (2017) as himself
 CBeebies Bedtime Stories (2020) as himself
 Demi Lovato: Dancing with the Devil (2021) as himself
 Brian Wilson: Long Promised Road (2021) as himself
 If These Walls Could Sing (2022) as himself

References

 
Videographies of British artists